The Hills of Donegal may refer to:

 The Hills of Donegal (film), a 1947 British film
 Las Vegas (In the Hills of Donegal), a song by Irish group Goats Don't Shave